Sinoadapis is a genus of adapiform primate that lived in Asia during the late Miocene.

References

Literature cited

 

Prehistoric strepsirrhines
Miocene mammals of Asia
Prehistoric primate genera
Fossil taxa described in 1985
Miocene primates of Asia